Off the Grid: Doin' It Dylan is a tribute album to Bob Dylan, by the Charlie Daniels Band. The album of Dylan covers was released April 1, 2014. When Daniels first moved to Nashville, he played guitar on three of Bob Dylan's albums, which were recorded there. Daniels attributes playing on these albums for helping him learn about the music business and especially for showing him how to lead his own band. He noted that Dylan had a sense of freedom and that he let the musician play the way he wanted to, instead of telling him how to play.

Critical reception

Stephen Thomas Erlewine of AllMusic writes that Daniels' "decision to cut an album devoted to Dylan is not out of the blue." as Daniels "played guitar and bass on the sessions that became Nashville Skyline, Self Portrait, and New Morning." Erlewine gives this album 4 out of a possible 5 stars.

In his review for Cover Me Songs, Joseph Wright says "In the end, each track on Off the Grid is less a Dylan tribute than a Daniels cover."

Sean Curnyn of Cinch Review writes, "It's the first time Daniels has recorded an album of Dylan covers, or as far as I know, any album dedicated to the songs of another writer."

Jim Moulton at No Depression writes, "Well, this is different for The Charlie Daniels Band. Some of the first sessions work on the guitar that Daniels did when he moved to Nashville was for Bob Dylan's Nashville Skyline Album. Charlie was just supposed to fill in for a day for a guitar player who did not show up. Unfortunately for the guitarist that did not show up, Dylan wanted Charlie to keep playing."

Track listing

The Band recorded the first officially released version of "I Shall Be Released" for their 1968 debut album, Music from Big Pink. The Band had previously served as Dylan's backing band from 1965 to 1967 on his first U.S. "electric" tour.

Musicians

Charlie Daniels – Vocals. Fiddle, Acoustic Guitar, Mandolin
Pat McDonald – Congas, Drums, Shaker, Tambourine
Charlie Hayward – Acoustic Bass
Bruce Brown – Banjo, Dobro, Acoustic Guitar, Harmonica, Mandolin, Background Vocals
Chris Wormer – 12 String Guitar , Acoustic Guitar, Slide Guitar, Background Vocals
Shannon Wickline – Piano
Casey Wood – Harmonium

Production
Charlie Daniels – Producer
Casey Wood – Producer, Engineer, Mixing
Jim DeMain – Mastering
Erick Anderson – Art Direction, Design, Photography
Roger Campbell – Recording Assistant
David Corlew – Compilation Producer
Bob Dylan – Tributee
BeBe Evans – Production Coordination
Bob Frank – Consultant
Wayne Halper – Business Affairs
Larry Brother Love – Cover Model
Paula Szeigis – Art Direction, Production Coordination
Angela Gresham Wheeler – Art Direction, Production Coordination

Track information and credits adapted from the album's liner notes.

See also
List of songs written by Bob Dylan
List of artists who have covered Bob Dylan songs

References

External links
Artist Official Site

2014 albums
Charlie Daniels albums
Bob Dylan tribute albums